Biriyaani is a 2020 Indian Malayalam-language drama film written and directed by Sajin Baabu. It features Kani Kusruti and Shailaja Jala in the lead roles. The film won NETPAC award for best film in 20th Asiatica Film Festival in Rome, Jury prize for Best Film at Banglore International Film Festival, best film at the Caleidoscope Indian Film festival, Boston etc. Actress Kani Kusruti won the best actress at the BRICS competition section of the 42nd Moscow Film Festival, best actress at the Caleidoscope Indian Film festival, second-best actress award at the Imagine Film Festival in Madrid, Spain, and the 2019 Kerala State Film Award for Best Actress at Kerala State Film Awards for her performance in this film.

Plot 

The film starts with Khadeeja having emotionless sex with her husband and then he gets to his daily chores the moment he is satisfied, an implication of the tag line of the film where women are treated as a piece of flesh without giving any considerations to their emotions. Later she starts masturbating which she enjoys, to which her husband is annoyed and laments that her clitoris was not properly circumcised, again implying that women are forbidden from enjoying sex as per tenets of religion.

Khadeeja has poor relations with her in-laws and her mother has lost sanity because of frequent anxiety attacks in her past when her husband would leave her alone when he had to go on long fishing trips. Khadeeja is educated only till high school, however her brother is well educated and had recently visited from Gulf after a short stint as an engineer. Khadeeja's mother suffers an anxiety attack when her son leaves her alone without providing any details. Khadeeja calms her down by telling her that they would host a feast for the village to commemorate her father's death anniversary.

We see TV debates that speak of more radical Wahabi culture coming from Malayalees returning from Saudi taking over the mild Sufi and Salafi culture of India, and this becomes a concern for most panellists as it is encouraging terrorist activities. Later we see Khadeeja and her mother facing an enquiry from the NIA for her brother's involvement with ISIS. Her husband instantly gives her divorce (by sending a text message with talaq written 3 times) so that his family does not bear the brunt of his community and also on the behest of a priest, who informs him she is bad luck. He forbids her to even talk to her son on phone. Khadeeja visits Abubakar, handler of her brother, who politely tells them not to visit him again so that he stays out of the radar of investigative agencies and in the meantime they also get a letter from the mosque informing them that they have been banished from their community. Both are left to fend for themselves. Sometime later Abubakar comes with a letter and money sent by her brother. Khadeeja returns the money and tells him that they only want her brother back. In the letter, her brother asks Khadeeja to take their mother to a shrine whose spiritual powers would heal his mother. When they arrive at the shrine, they meet the kind-hearted priest Bijil who tells Khadeeja that she should take her mother to the doctor and most of the people come here for the food given out by charitable devotees of the shrine. Like most people there Khadeeja makes the courtyard their home.

Khadeeja witnesses a woman bide her time at the shrine through prostitution and the priest masturbating in his quarters. The next day the priest meets her to clear the air between them, to which she taunts that she would go to hell, whereas he would go to heaven for masturbating,  highlighting the patriarchal tenets of her religion. A few days later Bijil shows her the news that her brother was shot dead by police in Kashmir, as well as the arrest of Abubakar as his handler. She is totally distraught, but hides this from her mother. Bijil gives Khadeeja keys to his home and a few blank cheques to that account in which he had received compensation given by the government to flood victims. Bijil being the sole survivor in his family finds no purpose to use these funds. Khadeeja and her mother travel to his village and settle themselves in his home however she is still reluctant to use his money. She has her lunch at her mess and cannot keep away from the prying eyes of the cashier. Later she is tracked down by a journalist who wants to do a piece on destitute family members of proclaimed terrorists. Later her mother accidentally reads the article and dies out of shock when it is revealed to her that her son is dead. Khadeeja withdraws all the money from the bank account and give it to Bijil so that he can put it to better use. On returning to the village, she seduces the cashier at the mess and they have sex. This is her first step into prostitution and gives up her identity as a conservative Muslim girl to suit her profession. Bijil is ambivalent about her profession, but helps her in any way he can. She expresses her desire to fulfill her mother's dying wish to host a feast to commemorate her father and brother's deaths. He tells her that since they are banished from the community no one would accept her invitation, so he suggests that they host an iftar feast but for them, it would be for her brother and father. Khadeeja agrees to this and also reveals that she is 5 months pregnant. Anticipation of motherhood gives her some happiness and new motivation to lead her lonely life.

They start giving out the invitation cards in the village, to her ex-husband as well. The local police take her to an isolated villa on the pretext of investigation (charges related to prostitution and links to her terrorist brother) and in an altercation she suffers a miscarriage. The police drop their investigation and bear her hospital expenses to keep her mum. Later she invites the police officers to the iftar as well. The next day preparations of feast begin and Khadeeja quietly slips her stillborn fetus into the biryani pot on the stove. Everyone arrives for the iftar and they feast on biryani to their heart's content, but she forbids Bijil to eat it. The next day Bijil is very disappointed to learn the truth and leaves her, telling that two wrongs cannot make a right. The last kind person gone from her life, she spends her last remaining pennies on feeding the dog and jumps into water,  presumably to her death.

Next, we see Khadeeja having sex with her ex-husband where she is in control and enjoys the action, presumably a way she thought her life should have been.

Cast
 Kani Kusruti as Khadeeja
 Shailaja Jala  as Suhara Beevi
 Anil Nedumangad as NIA Officer
 Shyam Reji as Thadiyan
 Surjith as Mohammad Bijil
 Mini I G as Journalist
 Thonakkal Jayachandran as Nazeer
 Bob Felix as Abubakar

Production
The film was shot at places close to Varkala, Thiruvananthapuram and also at some places in Tamil Nadu.

Kani Kusruti remembers having doubts about certain scenes in the film that feature nudity. "When Sajin approached me for the role, I felt that it was a bit too much. I knew the 'male gaze' would be there. It's unavoidable with male directors, sometimes even with female directors. I considered it for some time, then Sajin came back to me, saying that he had written that role with me in mind. None of my previous roles had a proper beginning, middle and end like this one did, so I decided to look at it as an opportunity," she says.

Release
The Central Board of Film Certification approved of the film with few cuts of close shots of the circumcision scene and that of the goat slaughter. Also the nudity was asked to be blurred. The film was rated ‘adults only’ by the Censor Board. Biriyaani was released in theatres across Kerala after few weeks of its screening in International Film Festival of Kerala. Around 12 theatres backed out from screening it.

Baradwaj Rangan of Film Companion South wrote "The film is about the travails of being an oppressed caste/class Muslim woman, and also about generally being Muslim in Kerala."

Awards
 Kerala State Film Award for Best Actress - 2020
 Best actress in the BRICS competition section at the 42nd Moscow International Film Festival.
 Jury price for Best Film at Bengaluru International Film Festival.
Kerala Film Critics Award for Best Screenplay
Special Mention at 67th National Film Awards

References

External links

2020 films
2020s Malayalam-language films
Indian feminist films
Films about women in India
2020 drama films